FLOW ANIME BEST is FLOW's third best album. It is a compilation of FLOW assembling all the songs released in anime. The album has two editions: regular and limited. The limited edition includes a Kira Kira☆BOX cover, a DVD with a short-anime featuring the band and Nana Mizuki, a special anime illustration book featuring various anime shows that FLOW did theme songs for, a special photo and illustration lyrics booklet and an event lottery ticket. It reached #5 on the Oricon charts and charted for 8 weeks.

Track listing

Source:

References

Sony Music Entertainment Japan albums
Flow (band) albums
2011 compilation albums